= City Hall Building (Lebanon, Pennsylvania) =

Demolished Italianate-style City Hall building in Pennsylvania, U.S.

City Hall Building, Lebanon, PA
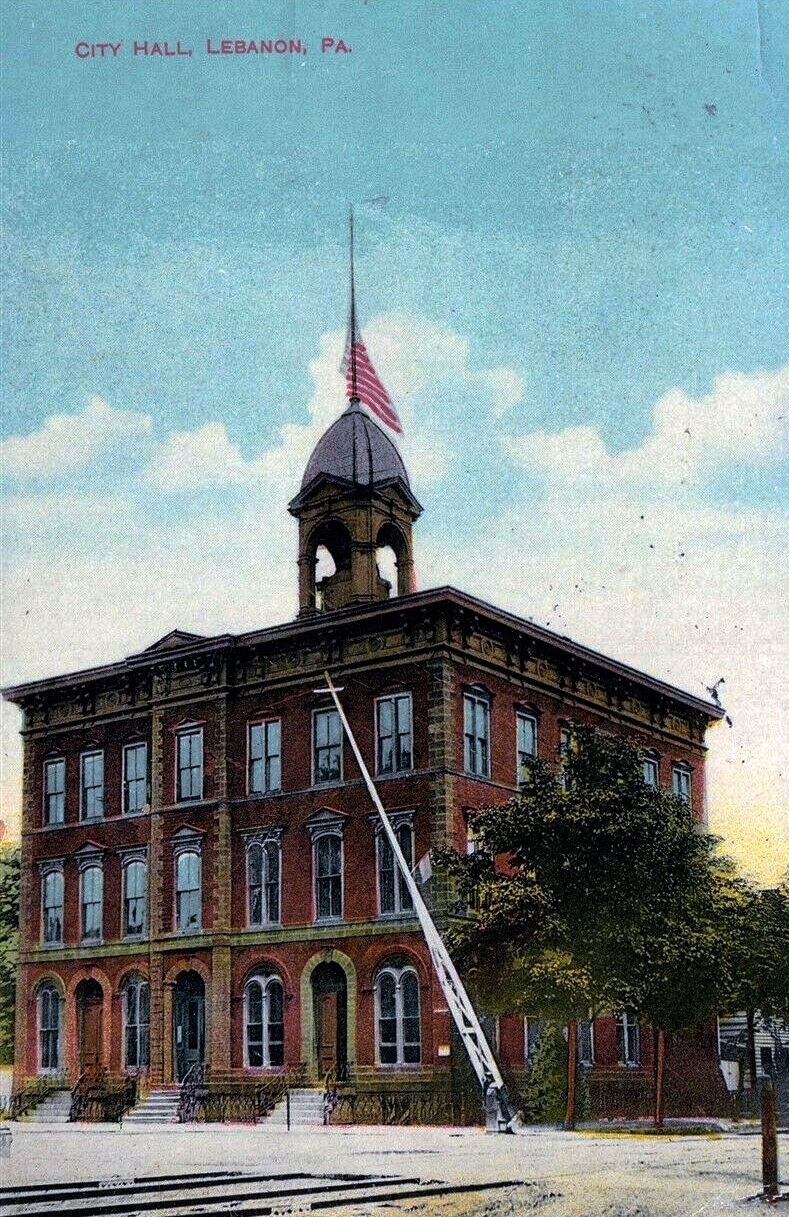
- Lebanon City Hall Building with a raised railroad crossing gate – c. 1912.

- Location within Pennsylvania Location within the United States
- Alternative names: Old City Hall building of Lebanon, PA

General information
- Type: Commercial
- Architectural style: Italianate
- Location: Lebanon, Pennsylvania, Ninth and Skull Streets
- Coordinates: 40°34′59″N 76°39′55″W
- Completed: 1873
- Renovated: 1897-1898
- Demolished: 1963
- Cost: $15,000 (in 1897) - ($528,246 in 2022 dollars)
- Owner: City of Lebanon, PA

The City Hall building, located at Ninth and Skull Streets, Lebanon, Lebanon County, Pennsylvania was an Italianate style three-story brick and sandstone commercial building constructed in 1873 by the Church of the Brethren's United Brethren Mutual Aid Society of Pennsylvania. The building served as the Lebanon City Hall building from 1898 until 1962. The centrally located cupola on the roof had a tall flagpole on its peak and was the building's most recognizable and distinctive feature. The building's water storage tank and a large bronze bell were housed within the cupola. In 1962, the City of Lebanon abandoned the building and moved all their offices into the newly constructed Lebanon County/City Municipal Building at 400 South 8th Street, Lebanon. The City Hall building was demolished the following year.

== Original Uses ==
From 1873 to around 1890, the building was used by the Church of the Brethren's United Brethren Mutual Aid Society of Pennsylvania for their local operations. During the early 1890s, the building was repurposed into a shoe factory.

== Purchased by the City of Lebanon ==
In 1897, the City of Lebanon purchased the building for $15,000. The building was then repurposed to house the city's offices. On September 9, 1898, the Lebanon City Council held its first meeting in the recently repurposed City Hall building. The City of Lebanon's police station, law enforcement offices and six single holding cells and one large cell for the confinement of prisoners were housed in the building's basement. The first floor housed the offices of the City Treasurer and Controller, the Mayor's office the Mayor's Court Room and a large wall vault. The second and third floors housed the Council Chambers, the law department, the city engineer, the fire alarm superintendent and fire alarm apparatus, a small chemical laboratory, several committee rooms and several multi-purpose rooms separated by folding doors.

== Abandonment ==
In 1962, after serving as the City of Lebanon's City Hall building for 65 years the city abandoned the structure as all of their offices were relocated to the newly constructed Lebanon County/City Municipal Building at 400 South 8th Street, Lebanon. Attempts to sell the building failed.

== Demolition ==
In March 1963, the City of Lebanon paid $2,960.50 to the Moody Salvage Company to demolish the structure. The 2,000-pound bronze bell that hung inside the cupola was the only artifact salvaged by the City of Lebanon.

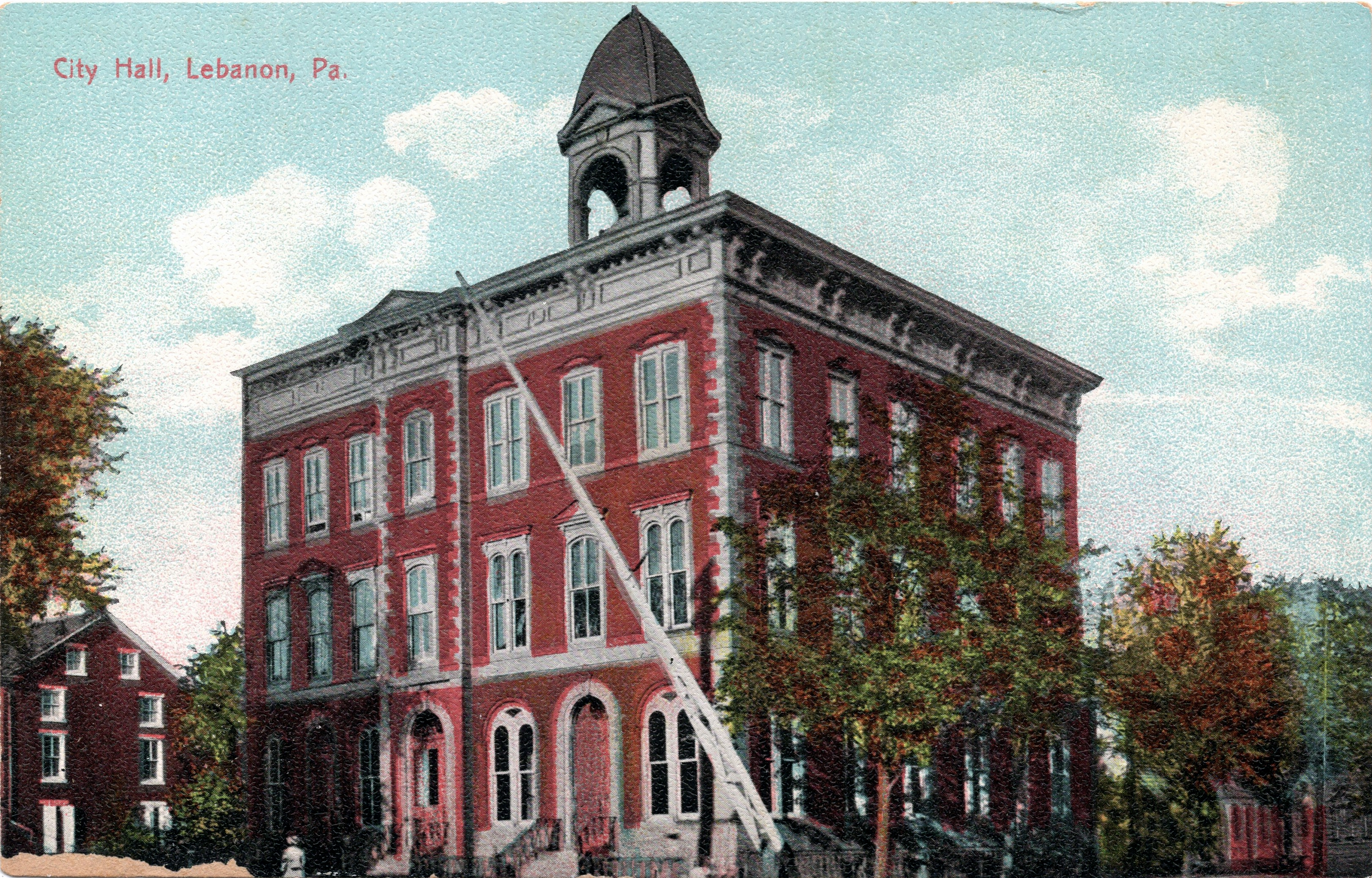
City Hall, Lebanon, Pa. - with a pedestrian walking north on Ninth Street, ca. 1915.

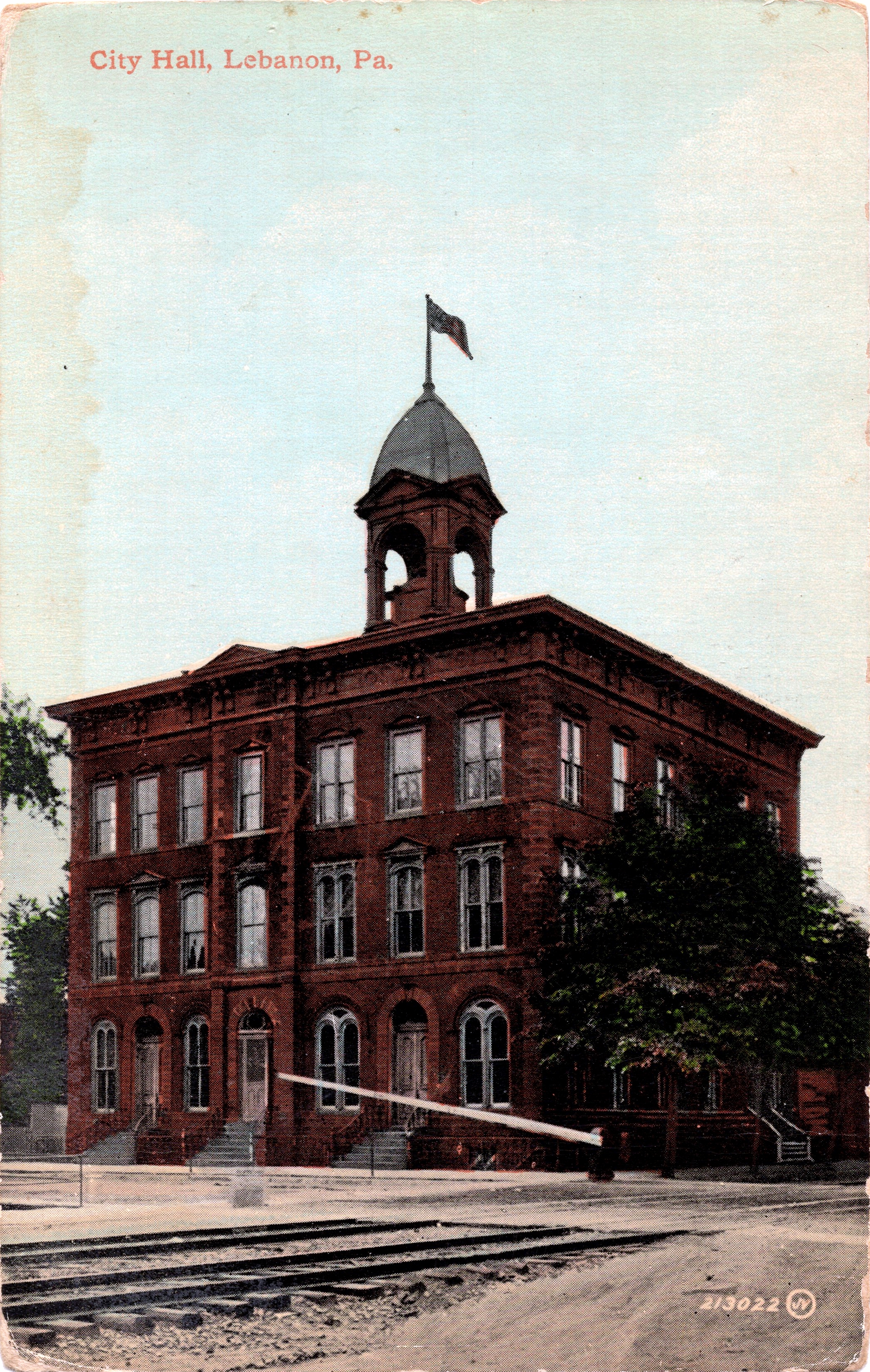
City Hall, Lebanon, Pa. - with lowered railroad crossing gate - ca. 1910.

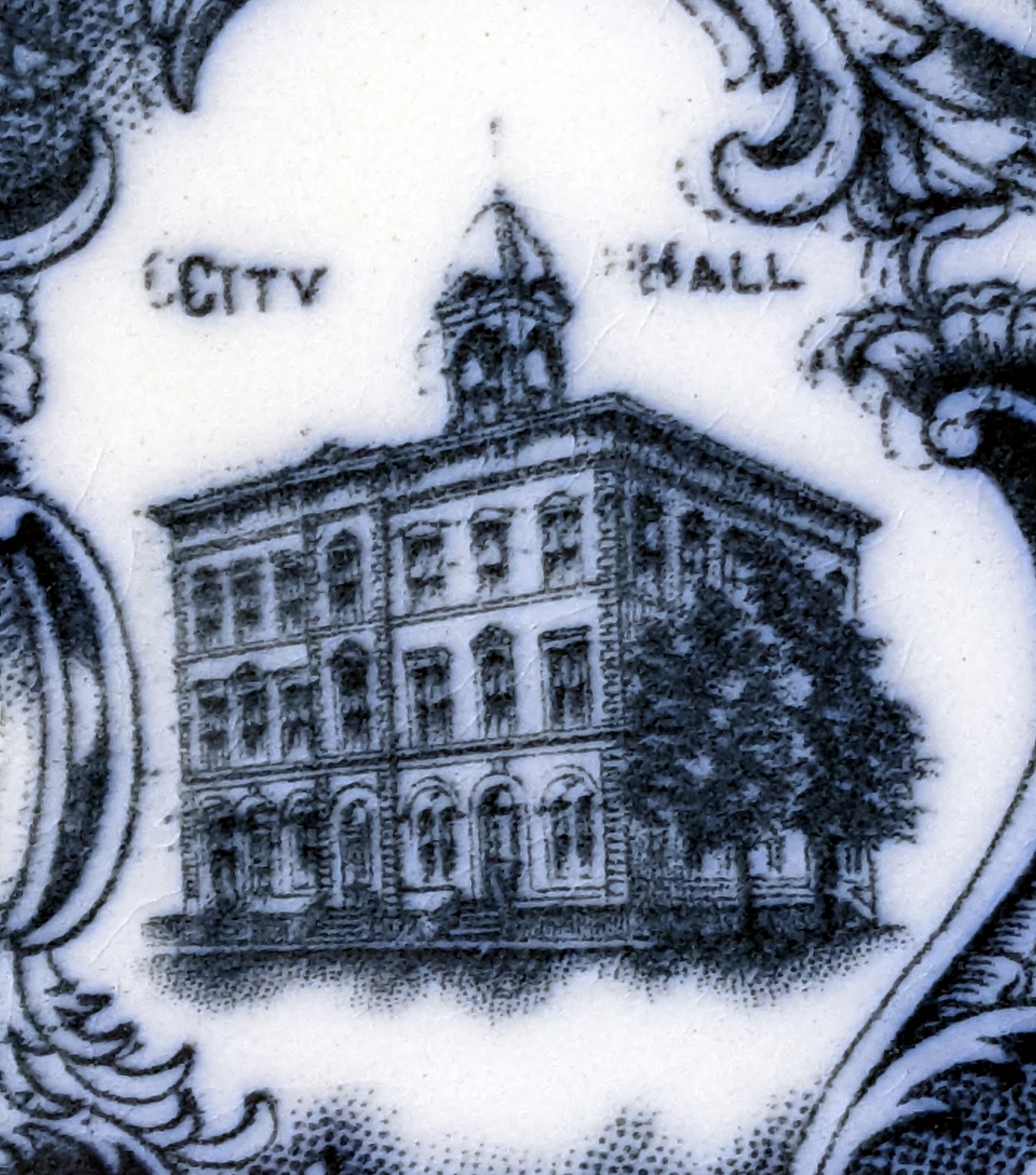
Wheelock Plate – View of the City Hall Building - ca. 1930s.

== Legacy ==
The City Hall building was one of Lebanon County's most interesting historic landmarks of the nineteenth and twentieth centuries. Its Italianate architectural style enabled it to stand out among almost every other building of its era in the City and County of Lebanon, Pennsylvania.
